= Greg Zaric =

Canadian economist

Dr. Greg Zaric is a Canadian economist and scientist, currently a Canada Research Chair in Health Care Management and Science at University of Western Ontario.
